The 2017 Coates Hire Ipswich SuperSprint was a motor racing event for the Supercars Championship, held on the weekend of 28 to 30 July 2017. The event was held at Queensland Raceway near Ipswich, Queensland and consisted of two races, 120 and 200 kilometres in length. It is the eighth event of fourteen in the 2017 Supercars Championship and hosted Races 15 and 16 of the season.

Background

Driver changes
Lucas Dumbrell Motorsport replaced Aaren Russell with Alex Davison for this and the following event.

This was the fourth and final round in which Super2 Series wildcards were allowed to compete in the main class. Shae Davies, Todd Hazelwood, Jack Le Brocq and James Golding were the four drivers to step up for this round.

Results

Race 15

Race

References

Ipswich SuperSprint
Ipswich SuperSprint